The 2017 Speedway Grand Prix season was the 23rd season of the Speedway Grand Prix era, and decided the 72nd FIM Speedway World Championship. It was seventeenth series under the promotion of Benfield Sports International, an IMG company.

The world title was won by Jason Doyle, who finished ahead of debutant Patryk Dudek and former two-time champion Tai Woffinden. It was the first title of Doyle's career, and the first time an Australian had lifted the trophy since Chris Holder in 2012. Defending champion Greg Hancock was unable to complete the season after suffering an injury, competing in only six of the 12 rounds.

Qualification 
For the 2017 season there were 15 permanent riders, joined at each Grand Prix by one wild card and two track reserves.

The top eight riders from the 2016 championship qualified automatically. Those riders were joined by the three riders who qualified via the Grand Prix Challenge.

The final four riders were nominated by series promoters, Benfield Sports International, following the completion of the 2016 season.

Qualified riders

Qualified substitutes 

The following riders were nominated as substitutes:

Calendar

The 2017 season consisted of 12 events, one more than the 2016 series.

Final Classification

See also 
 2017 Individual Speedway Junior World Championship
 2018 Speedway Grand Prix

References

External links 
 SpeedwayGP.com – Speedway World Championships

 
2017
Grand Prix